Multichannel or multi-channel may refer to: 

Multichannel audio, i.e. 
Stereophonic sound, namely two channel audio
Surround sound, more than two channel audio
Ambisonics, a studio or live way of recording with many channels
 Offering multiple audio tracks on a broadcast channel: see Sound multiplex in broadcasting
Multichannel television sound, an American standard for analogue television
 Having or offering multiple television channels: see Multichannel television
Digital multicast television network
Multichannel Multipoint Distribution Service (MMDS), a standard for analogue television
Multichannel television in Canada
Multichannel television in the United States
Multichannel marketing
 Multi-channel network, a YouTube classification of for-profit channels
 Multichannel News
MPEG Multichannel
MADI, Multichannel Audio Digital Interface
McASP, Multichannel Audio Serial Port
Scanning Multichannel Microwave Radiometer
Joint multichannel trunking and switching system
Multibus, Multichannel I/O Bus
MVDDS, Multichannel Video and Data Distribution Service
MMDF, Multichannel Memorandum Distribution Facility